This is a list of Harlequin Romance novels released in 2000.

Releases

References 

Romance novels
Lists of novels
2000 novels